Willi Heinz (born 24 November 1986) is a professional rugby union player who currently plays for Canterbury in the Bunnings NPC and Crusaders in the Super Rugby . Heinz started his professional career with the 2 clubs before moving to England and playing for Gloucester and Worcester Warriors in the Premiership. After almost a decade away he returned to his home clubs in 2022. Born in Christchurch, New Zealand, he represented England in international rugby.

Heinz played four years in his XV rugby team at school, Burnside High, which is a record for the school.

On 24 February 2015, English Premiership club Gloucester Rugby announced his signing for the start of the 2015–16 season.

In May 2017, he was invited to a training camp with the senior England squad by Eddie Jones. Heinz qualifies to represent England through his grandmother.

In August 2019, he was selected as the starting scrum-half and vice-captain for England's first summer international against Wales. That game marked his international debut for the England national team. The next day, Heinz was named in England's 31-man squad for the 2019 Rugby World Cup.

On 23 February 2021, Heinz agreed to leave Gloucester for local rivals Worcester Warriors after six seasons on a two-year contract, option for a further season from the 2021–22 season. He left with immediate effect to return to New Zealand in March 2022.

References

External links

Gloucester Rugby Profile
Crusaders Profile

Living people
1986 births
Rugby union players from Christchurch
New Zealand rugby union players
Crusaders (rugby union) players
Canterbury rugby union players
Rugby union scrum-halves
Gloucester Rugby players
New Zealand expatriate rugby union players
New Zealand expatriate sportspeople in England
Expatriate rugby union players in England
England international rugby union players
Worcester Warriors players
English rugby union players